Technetium-99m (99mTc) is a metastable nuclear isomer of technetium-99 (itself an isotope of technetium), symbolized as 99mTc, that is used in tens of millions of medical diagnostic procedures annually, making it the most commonly used medical radioisotope in the world.

Technetium-99m is used as a radioactive tracer and can be detected in the body by medical equipment (gamma cameras). It is well suited to the role, because it emits readily detectable gamma rays with a photon energy of 140 keV (these 8.8 pm photons are about the same wavelength as emitted by conventional X-ray diagnostic equipment) and its half-life for gamma emission is 6.0058 hours (meaning 93.7% of it decays to 99Tc in 24 hours). The relatively "short" physical half-life of the isotope and its biological half-life of 1 day (in terms of human activity and metabolism) allows for scanning procedures which collect data rapidly but keep total patient radiation exposure low. The same characteristics make the isotope unsuitable for therapeutic use.

Technetium-99m was discovered as a product of cyclotron bombardment of molybdenum. This procedure produced molybdenum-99, a radionuclide with a longer half-life (2.75 days), which decays to 99mTc. This longer decay time allows for 99Mo to be shipped to medical facilities, where 99mTc is extracted from the sample as it is produced. In turn, 99Mo is usually created commercially by fission of highly enriched uranium in a small number of research and material testing nuclear reactors in several countries.

History

Discovery
In 1938, Emilio Segrè and Glenn T. Seaborg isolated for the first time the metastable isotope technetium-99m, after bombarding natural molybdenum with 8 MeV deuterons in the  cyclotron of Ernest Orlando Lawrence's Radiation laboratory. In 1970 Seaborg explained that:

Later in 1940, Emilio Segrè and Chien-Shiung Wu published experimental results of an analysis of fission products of uranium-235, including molybdenum-99, and detected the presence of an isomer of element 43 with a 6-hour half life, later labelled as technetium-99m.

Early medical applications in the United States

99mTc remained a scientific curiosity until the 1950s when Powell Richards realized the potential of technetium-99m as a medical radiotracer and promoted its use among the medical community. While Richards was in charge of the radioisotope production at the Hot Lab Division of the Brookhaven National Laboratory, Walter Tucker and Margaret Greene were working on how to improve the separation process purity of the short-lived eluted daughter product iodine-132 from its parent, tellurium-132 (with a half life of 3.2 days), produced in the Brookhaven Graphite Research Reactor. They detected a trace contaminant which proved to be 99mTc, which was coming from 99Mo and was following tellurium in the chemistry of the separation process for other fission products. Based on the similarities between the chemistry of the tellurium-iodine parent-daughter pair, Tucker and Greene developed the first technetium-99m generator in 1958. It was not until 1960 that Richards became the first to suggest the idea of using technetium as a medical tracer.

The first US publication to report on medical scanning of 99mTc appeared in August 1963. Sorensen and Archambault demonstrated that intravenously injected carrier-free 99Mo selectively and efficiently concentrated in the liver, becoming an internal generator of 99mTc. After build-up of 99mTc, they could visualize the liver using the 140 keV gamma ray emission.

Worldwide expansion
The production and medical use of 99mTc rapidly expanded across the world in the 1960s, benefiting from the development and continuous improvements of the gamma cameras.

Americas 
Between 1963 and 1966, numerous scientific studies demonstrated the use of 99mTc as radiotracer or diagnostic tool. As a consequence the demand for 99mTc grew exponentially and by 1966, Brookhaven National Laboratory was unable to cope with the demand. Production and distribution of 99mTc generators were transferred to private companies. "TechneKow-CS generator", the first commercial 99mTc generator, was produced by Nuclear Consultants, Inc. (St. Louis, Missouri) and Union Carbide Nuclear Corporation (Tuxedo, New York). From 1967 to 1984, 99Mo was produced for Mallinckrodt Nuclear Company at the Missouri University Research Reactor (MURR).

Union Carbide actively developed a process to produce and separate useful isotopes like 99Mo from mixed fission products that resulted from the irradiation of highly enriched uranium (HEU) targets in nuclear reactors developed from 1968 to 1972 at the Cintichem facility (formerly the Union Carbide Research Center built in the Sterling forest in Tuxedo, New York). The Cintichem process originally used 93% highly enriched U-235 deposited as UO2 on the inside of a cylindrical target.

At the end of the 1970s,  of total fission product radiation were extracted weekly from 20 to 30 reactor bombarded HEU capsules, using the so-called "Cintichem [chemical isolation] process." The research facility with its 1961 5-MW pool-type research reactor was later sold to Hoffman-LaRoche and became Cintichem Inc. In 1980, Cintichem, Inc. began the production/isolation of 99Mo in its reactor, and became the single U.S. producer of 99Mo during the 1980s. However, in 1989, Cintichem detected an underground leak of radioactive products that led to the reactor shutdown and decommissioning, putting an end to the commercial production of 99Mo in the USA.

The production of 99Mo started in Canada in the early 1970s and was shifted to the NRU reactor in the mid-1970s. By 1978 the reactor provided technetium-99m in large enough quantities that were processed by AECL's radiochemical division, which was privatized in 1988 as Nordion, now MDS Nordion. In the 1990s a substitution for the aging NRU reactor for production of radioisotopes was planned. The Multipurpose Applied Physics Lattice Experiment (MAPLE) was designed as a dedicated isotope-production facility. Initially, two identical MAPLE reactors were to be built at Chalk River Laboratories, each capable of supplying 100% of the world's medical isotope demand. However, problems with the MAPLE 1 reactor, most notably a positive power co-efficient of reactivity, led to the cancellation of the project in 2008.

The first commercial 99mTc generators were produced in Argentina in 1967, with 99Mo produced in the CNEA's RA-1 Enrico Fermi reactor. Besides its domestic market CNEA supplies 99Mo to some South American countries.

Asia 
In 1967, the first 99mTc procedures were carried out in Auckland, New Zealand. 99Mo was initially supplied by Amersham, UK, then by the Australian Nuclear Science and Technology Organisation (ANSTO) in Lucas Heights, Australia.

Europe 
In May 1963, Scheer and Maier-Borst were the first to introduce the use of 99mTc for medical applications.
In 1968, Philips-Duphar (later Mallinckrodt, today Covidien) marketed the first technetium-99m generator produced in Europe and distributed from Petten, the Netherlands.

Shortage
Global shortages of technetium-99m emerged in the late 2000s because two aging nuclear reactors (NRU and HFR) that provided about two-thirds of the world's supply of molybdenum-99, which itself has a half-life of only 66 hours, were shut down repeatedly for extended maintenance periods. In May 2009 the Atomic Energy of Canada Limited announced the detection of a small leak of heavy water in the NRU reactor that remained out of service until completion of the repairs in August 2010. After the observation of gas bubble jets released from one of the deformations of primary cooling water circuits in August 2008, the HFR reactor was stopped for a thorough safety investigation. NRG received in February 2009 a temporary license to operate HFR only when necessary for medical radioisotope production. HFR stopped for repairs at the beginning of 2010 and was restarted in September 2010.

Two replacement Canadian reactors (see MAPLE Reactor) constructed in the 1990s were closed before beginning operation, for safety reasons.  A construction permit for a new production facility to be built in Columbia, MO was issued in May 2018.

Nuclear properties
Technetium-99m is a metastable nuclear isomer, as indicated by the "m" after its mass number 99. This means it is a nuclide in an excited (metastable) state that lasts much longer than is typical. The nucleus will eventually relax (i.e., de-excite) to its ground state through the emission of gamma rays or internal conversion electrons. Both of these decay modes rearrange the nucleons without transmuting the technetium into another element.

99mTc decays mainly by gamma emission, slightly less than 88% of the time. (99mTc → 99Tc + γ) About 98.6% of these gamma decays result in 140.5 keV gamma rays and the remaining 1.4% are to gammas of a slightly higher energy at 142.6 keV. These are the radiations that are picked up by a gamma camera when 99mTc is used as a radioactive tracer for medical imaging. The remaining approximately 12% of 99mTc decays are by means of internal conversion, resulting in ejection of high speed internal conversion electrons in several sharp peaks (as is typical of electrons from this type of decay) also at about 140 keV (99mTc → 99Tc+ + e−). These conversion electrons will ionize the surrounding matter like beta radiation electrons would do, contributing along with the 140.5 keV and 142.6 keV gammas to the total deposited dose.

Pure gamma emission is the desirable decay mode for medical imaging because other particles deposit more energy in the patient body (radiation dose) than in the camera. Metastable isomeric transition is the only nuclear decay mode that approaches pure gamma emission.

99mTc's half-life of 6.0058 hours is considerably longer (by 14 orders of magnitude, at least) than most nuclear isomers, though not unique. This is still a short half-life relative to many other known modes of radioactive decay and it is in the middle of the range of half lives for radiopharmaceuticals used for medical imaging.

After gamma emission or internal conversion, the resulting ground-state technetium-99 then decays with a half-life of 211,000 years to stable ruthenium-99. This process emits soft beta radiation without a gamma. Such low radioactivity from the daughter product(s) is a desirable feature for radiopharmaceuticals.
^{99\!m}_{43}Tc ->[\ce{\gamma\ 141 keV}][\ce{6 h}] {}^{99}_{43}Tc ->[\ce{\beta^-\ 249 keV}][211,000\ \ce{y}] \overbrace{\underset{(stable)}{^{99}_{44}Ru}}^{ruthenium-99}

Production

Production of 99Mo in nuclear reactors

Neutron irradiation of uranium-235 targets 
The parent nuclide of 99mTc, 99Mo, is mainly extracted for medical purposes from the fission products created in neutron-irradiated uranium-235 targets, the majority of which is produced in five nuclear research reactors around the world using highly enriched uranium (HEU) targets. Smaller amounts of 99Mo are produced from low-enriched uranium in at least three reactors.

Neutron activation of 98Mo 
Production of 99Mo by neutron activation of natural molybdenum, or molybdenum enriched in 98Mo, is another, currently smaller, route of production.

Production of 99mTc/99Mo in particle accelerators

Production of "Instant" 99mTc 
The feasibility of 99mTc production with the 22-MeV-proton bombardment of a 100Mo target in medical cyclotrons was demonstrated in 1971. The recent shortages of 99mTc reignited the interest in the production of "instant" 99mTc by proton bombardment of isotopically enriched 100Mo targets (>99.5%) following the reaction 100Mo(p,2n)99mTc. Canada is commissioning such cyclotrons, designed by Advanced Cyclotron Systems, for 99mTc production at the University of Alberta and the Université de Sherbrooke, and is planning others at the University of British Columbia, TRIUMF, University of Saskatchewan and Lakehead University.

A particular drawback of cyclotron production via (p,2n) on 100Mo is the significant co-production of  99gTc. The preferential in-growth of this nuclide occurs due to the larger reaction cross-section pathway leading to the ground state, which is almost five times higher at the cross-section maximum in comparison with the metastable one at the same energy. Depending on the time required to process the target material and recovery of 99mTc, the amount of 99mTc  relative to 99gTc will continue to decrease, in turn reducing the specific activity of 99mTc available. It has been reported that ingrowth of 99gTc as well as the presence of other Tc isotopes can negatively affect subsequent labelling and/or imaging; however, the use of high purity 100Mo targets, specified proton beam energies, and appropriate time of use have shown to be sufficient for yielding 99mTc from a cyclotron comparable to that from a commercial generator.  Liquid metal molybdenum-containing targets have been proposed that would aid in streamlined processing, ensuring better production yields. A particular problem associated with the continued reuse of recycled, enriched 100Mo targets is unavoidable transmutation of the target as other Mo isotopes are generated during irradiation and cannot be easily removed post-processing.

Indirect routes of production of 99Mo 

Other particle accelerator-based isotope production techniques have been investigated. The supply disruptions of 99Mo in the late 2000s and the ageing of the producing nuclear reactors forced the industry to look into alternative methods of production. The use of cyclotrons or electron accelerators to produce 99Mo from 100Mo via (p,pn) or (γ,n) reactions, respectively, has been further investigated. The (n,2n) reaction on 100Mo yields a higher reaction cross-section for high energy neutrons than of (n,γ) on 98Mo with thermal neutrons.  In particular, this method requires accelerators that generate fast neutron spectrums, such as ones using D-T or other fusion-based reactions, or high energy spallation or knock out reactions. A disadvantage of these techniques is the necessity for enriched 100Mo targets, which are significantly more expensive than natural isotopic targets and typically require recycling of the material, which can be costly, time-consuming, and arduous.

Technetium-99m generators

Technetium-99m's short half-life of 6 hours makes storage impossible and would make transport very expensive. Instead, its parent nuclide 99Mo is supplied to hospitals after its extraction from the neutron-irradiated uranium targets and its purification in dedicated processing facilities. It is shipped by specialised radiopharmaceutical companies in the form of technetium-99m generators worldwide or directly distributed to the local market. The generators, colloquially known as moly cows, are devices designed to provide radiation shielding for transport and to minimize the extraction work done at the medical facility. A typical dose rate at 1 metre from the 99mTc generator is 20-50 μSv/h during transport. These generators' output declines with time and must be replaced weekly, since the half-life of 99Mo is still only 66 hours.

Molybdenum-99 spontaneously decays to excited states of 99Tc through beta decay. Over 87% of the decays lead to the  excited state of 99mTc. A  electron and a  electron antineutrino are emitted in the process (99Mo → 99mTc +  + ). The  electrons are easily shielded for transport, and 99mTc generators are only minor radiation hazards, mostly due to secondary X-rays produced by the electrons (also known as Bremsstrahlung).

At the hospital, the 99mTc that forms through 99Mo decay is chemically extracted from the technetium-99m generator. Most commercial 99Mo/99mTc generators use column chromatography, in which 99Mo in the form of water-soluble molybdate, MoO42− is adsorbed onto acid alumina (Al2O3). When the 99Mo decays, it forms pertechnetate TcO4−, which, because of its single charge, is less tightly bound to the alumina. Pulling normal saline solution through the column of immobilized 99MoO42− elutes the soluble 99mTcO4−, resulting in a saline solution containing the 99mTc as the dissolved sodium salt of the pertechnetate. One technetium-99m generator, holding only a few micrograms of 99Mo, can potentially diagnose 10,000 patients because it will be producing 99mTc strongly for over a week.

Preparation

Technetium exits the generator in the form of the pertechnetate ion, TcO4−. The oxidation state of Tc in this compound is +7. This is directly suitable for medical applications only in bone scans (it is taken up by osteoblasts) and some thyroid scans (it is taken up in place of iodine by normal thyroid tissues). In other types of scans relying on 99mTc, a reducing agent is added to the pertechnetate solution to bring the oxidation state of the technecium down to +3 or +4. Secondly, a ligand is added to form a coordination complex. The ligand is chosen to have an affinity for the specific organ to be targeted. For example, the exametazime complex of Tc in oxidation state +3 is able to cross the blood–brain barrier and flow through the vessels in the brain for cerebral blood flow imaging. Other ligands include sestamibi for myocardial perfusion imaging and mercapto acetyl triglycine for MAG3 scan to measure renal function.

Medical uses
In 1970, Eckelman and Richards presented the first "kit" containing all the ingredients required to release the 99mTc, "milked" from the generator, in the chemical form to be administered to the patient.

Technetium-99m is used in 20 million diagnostic nuclear medical procedures every year. Approximately 85% of diagnostic imaging procedures in nuclear medicine use this isotope as radioactive tracer. Klaus Schwochau's book Technetium lists 31 radiopharmaceuticals based on 99mTc for imaging and functional studies of the brain, myocardium, thyroid, lungs, liver, gallbladder, kidneys, skeleton, blood, and tumors. A more recent review is also available.

Depending on the procedure, the 99mTc is tagged (or bound to) a pharmaceutical that transports it to its required location. For example, when 99mTc is chemically bound to exametazime (HMPAO), the drug is able to cross the blood–brain barrier and flow through the vessels in the brain for cerebral blood-flow imaging. This combination is also used for labeling white blood cells (99mTc labeled WBC) to visualize sites of infection. 99mTc sestamibi is used for myocardial perfusion imaging, which shows how well the blood flows through the heart. Imaging to measure renal function is done by attaching 99mTc to mercaptoacetyl triglycine (MAG3); this procedure is known as a MAG3 scan.

Technetium-99m (Tc-99m) can be readily detected in the body by medical equipment because it emits 140.5 keV gamma rays (these are about the same wavelength as emitted by conventional X-ray diagnostic equipment), and its half-life for gamma emission is six hours (meaning 94% of it decays to 99Tc in 24 hours). Besides, it emits no particle radiation, thus keeping radiation dosage low. Its decay product, 99Tc, has a relatively long half-life (211,000 years) and emits little radiation. The short physical half-life of 99mTc and its biological half-life of 1 day with its other favourable properties allows scanning procedures to collect data rapidly and keep total patient radiation exposure low. Chemically, technetium is selectively concentrated in thyroid, salivary glands, and stomach and excluded from cerebrospinal fluid. Combination with perchlorate abolishes its selectiveness.

Radiation side-effects
Diagnostic treatment involving technetium-99m will result in radiation exposure to technicians, patients, and passers-by. These doses result in radiation exposures to the patient around 10 mSv (1000 mrem), the equivalent of about 500 chest X-ray exposures. This level of radiation exposure is estimated by the linear no-threshold model to carry a 1 in 1000 lifetime risk of developing a solid cancer or leukemia in the patient. The risk is higher in younger patients, and lower in older ones. Unlike a chest x-ray, the radiation source is inside the patient and will be carried around for a few days, exposing others to second-hand radiation. A spouse who stays constantly by the side of the patient through this time might receive one thousandth of patient's radiation dose this way.

The short half-life of the isotope allows for scanning procedures that collect data rapidly. The isotope is also of a very low energy level for a gamma emitter. Its ~140 keV of energy make it safer for use because of the substantially reduced ionization compared with other gamma emitters. The energy of gammas from 99mTc is about the same as the radiation from a commercial diagnostic X-ray machine, although the number of gammas emitted results in radiation doses more comparable to X-ray studies like computed tomography.

Technetium-99m has several features that make it safer than other possible isotopes. Its gamma decay mode can be easily detected by a camera, allowing the use of smaller quantities. And because technetium-99m has a short half-life, its quick decay into the far less radioactive technetium-99 results in relatively low total radiation dose to the patient per unit of initial activity after administration, as compared with other radioisotopes. In the form administered in these medical tests (usually pertechnetate), technetium-99m and technetium-99 are eliminated from the body within a few days.

3-D scanning technique: SPECT

Single-photon emission computed tomography (SPECT) is a nuclear medicine imaging technique using gamma rays. It may be used with any gamma-emitting isotope, including 99mTc. In the use of technetium-99m, the radioisotope is administered to the patient and the escaping gamma rays are incident upon a moving gamma camera which computes and processes the image. To acquire SPECT images, the gamma camera is rotated around the patient. Projections are acquired at defined points during the rotation, typically every three to six degrees. In most cases, a full 360° rotation is used to obtain an optimal reconstruction. The time taken to obtain each projection is also variable, but 15–20 seconds are typical. This gives a total scan time of 15–20 minutes.

The technetium-99m radioisotope is used predominantly in bone and brain scans. For bone scans, the pertechnetate ion is used directly, as it is taken up by osteoblasts attempting to heal a skeletal injury, or (in some cases) as a reaction of these cells to a tumor (either primary or metastatic) in the bone. In brain scanning, 99mTc is attached to the chelating agent HMPAO to create technetium (99mTc) exametazime, an agent which localizes in the brain according to region blood flow, making it useful for the detection of stroke and dementing illnesses that decrease regional brain flow and metabolism.

Most recently, technetium-99m scintigraphy has been combined with CT coregistration technology to produce SPECT/CT scans. These employ the same radioligands and have the same uses as SPECT scanning, but are able to provide even finer 3-D localization of high-uptake tissues, in cases where finer resolution is needed. An example is the sestamibi parathyroid scan which is performed using the 99mTc radioligand sestamibi, and can be done in either SPECT or SPECT/CT machines.

Bone scan
The nuclear medicine technique commonly called the bone scan usually uses 99mTc. It is not to be confused with the "bone density scan", DEXA, which is a low-exposure X-ray test measuring bone density to look for osteoporosis and other diseases where bones lose mass without rebuilding activity. The nuclear medicine technique is sensitive to areas of unusual bone rebuilding activity, since the radiopharmaceutical is taken up by osteoblast cells which build bone. The technique therefore is sensitive to fractures and bone reaction to bone tumors, including metastases. Medronic acid is a phosphate derivative which can exchange places with bone phosphate in regions of active bone growth, so anchoring the radioisotope to that specific region. To view small lesions (less than ) especially in the spine, the SPECT imaging technique may be required, but currently in the United States, most insurance companies require separate authorization for SPECT imaging.

Myocardial perfusion imaging

Myocardial perfusion imaging (MPI) is a form of functional cardiac imaging, used for the diagnosis of ischemic heart disease. The underlying principle is, under conditions of stress, diseased myocardium receives less blood flow than normal myocardium. MPI is one of several types of cardiac stress test. As a nuclear stress test, the average radiation exposure is 9.4 mSv, which when compared with a typical 2 view chest X-ray (.1 mSv) is equivalent to 94 Chest X-rays.

Several radiopharmaceuticals and radionuclides may be used for this, each giving different information. In the myocardial perfusion scans using 99mTc, the radiopharmaceuticals 99mTc-tetrofosmin (Myoview, GE Healthcare) or 99mTc-sestamibi (Cardiolite, Bristol-Myers Squibb) are used. Following this, myocardial stress is induced, either by exercise or pharmacologically with adenosine, dobutamine or dipyridamole(Persantine), which increase the heart rate or by regadenoson(Lexiscan), a vasodilator. (Aminophylline can be used to reverse the effects of dipyridamole and regadenoson). Scanning may then be performed with a conventional gamma camera, or with SPECT/CT.

Cardiac ventriculography
In cardiac ventriculography, a radionuclide, usually 99mTc, is injected, and the heart is imaged to evaluate the flow through it, to evaluate coronary artery disease, valvular heart disease, congenital heart diseases, cardiomyopathy, and other cardiac disorders. As a nuclear stress test, the average radiation exposure is 9.4 mSv, which when compared with a typical 2 view chest X-ray (.1 mSv) is equivalent to 94 Chest X-Rays. It exposes patients to less radiation than comparable chest X-ray studies.

Functional brain imaging
Usually the gamma-emitting tracer used in functional brain imaging is 99mTc-HMPAO (hexamethylpropylene amine oxime, exametazime). The similar 99mTc-EC tracer may also be used. These molecules are preferentially distributed to regions of high brain blood flow, and act to assess brain metabolism regionally, in an attempt to diagnose and differentiate the different causal pathologies of dementia. When used with the 3-D SPECT technique, they compete with brain FDG-PET scans and fMRI brain scans as techniques to map the regional metabolic rate of brain tissue.

Sentinel-node identification
The radioactive properties of 99mTc can be used to identify the predominant lymph nodes draining a cancer, such as breast cancer or malignant melanoma. This is usually performed at the time of biopsy or resection.99mTc-labelled filtered sulfur colloid or Technetium (99mTc) tilmanocept are injected intradermally around the intended biopsy site. The general location of the sentinel node is determined with the use of a handheld scanner with a gamma-sensor probe that detects the technetium-99m–labeled tracer that was previously injected around the biopsy site. An injection of Methylene blue or isosulfan blue is done at the same time to dye any draining nodes visibly blue.  An incision is then made over the area of highest radionuclide accumulation, and the sentinel node is identified within the incision by inspection; the isosulfan blue dye will usually stain any lymph nodes blue that are draining from the area around the tumor.

Immunoscintigraphy
Immunoscintigraphy incorporates 99mTc into a monoclonal antibody, an immune system protein, capable of binding to cancer cells. A few hours after injection, medical equipment is used to detect the gamma rays emitted by the 99mTc; higher concentrations indicate where the tumor is. This technique is particularly useful for detecting hard-to-find cancers, such as those affecting the intestines. These modified antibodies are sold by the German company Hoechst (now part of Sanofi-Aventis) under the name Scintimun.

Blood pool labeling
When 99mTc is combined with a tin compound, it binds to red blood cells and can therefore be used to map circulatory system disorders. It is commonly used to detect gastrointestinal bleeding sites as well as ejection fraction, heart wall motion abnormalities, abnormal shunting, and to perform ventriculography.

Pyrophosphate for heart damage
A pyrophosphate ion with 99mTc adheres to calcium deposits in damaged heart muscle, making it useful to gauge damage after a heart attack.

Sulfur colloid for spleen scan
The sulfur colloid of 99mTc is scavenged by the spleen, making it possible to image the structure of the spleen.

Meckel's diverticulum
Pertechnetate is actively accumulated and secreted by the mucoid cells of the gastric mucosa, and therefore, technetate(VII) radiolabeled with Tc99m is injected into the body when looking for ectopic gastric tissue as is found in a Meckel's diverticulum with Meckel's Scans.

See also 
 Cholescintigraphy
 Isotopes of technetium
 Transient equilibrium

Notes

References 
Citations

Bibliography

Further reading

External links 
99mTc production simulator – IAEA 

 
Metastable isotopes
Medical physics
Radiochemistry
Medicinal radiochemistry
Medical isotopes